Giannis Diamantidis (born in 1948 in Athens, Greece) is a Greek politician of the Panhellenic Socialist Movement and the former Minister for Maritime Affairs, Islands and Fisheries of Greece.

Life
Giannis Diamantidis was born in 1948 in Nikaia, Greece. He is the son of Dimitris Diamantidis, a former Member of Parliament, and Polyxeni Leontiadou. He studied at the Department of Economics and Political Sciences of the National and Kapodistrian University of Athens. During the Greek military junta of 1967–1974, he took part in the Law School protests of March 1973 against the regime.

Giannis Diamantidis has been continuously elected as a member of the Hellenic Parliament between 1989 (November) and 2012 for the Panhellenic Socialist Movement (PASOK) in the Piraeus B constituency. In the cabinet reshuffle of 7 September 2010, he was chosen to head the revived Ministry of Maritime Affairs, Islands and Fisheries, his first cabinet post. He held the position until 17 June 2011, when the ministry was again merged with the Ministry of Regional Development and Competitiveness to form the Ministry of Development, Competitiveness and Shipping.

References
 Biography of Giannis Diamantidis at his official website 
 

1948 births
PASOK politicians
Living people
National and Kapodistrian University of Athens alumni
Greek MPs 1989–1990
Greek MPs 1990–1993
Greek MPs 1993–1996
Greek MPs 1996–2000
Greek MPs 2000–2004
Greek MPs 2004–2007
Greek MPs 2007–2009
Greek MPs 2009–2012
Politicians from Piraeus